Jeremiah Best (23 January 1901 – 18 March 1975) was an English football player who began his career in England before moving to the American Soccer League. He led the league in scoring in 1930. In 1931, he returned to England, where he finished his career. He was born in Mickley, England.

Career
Best began his professional career in December 1919 with Newcastle United. He played only two games before being transferred to Leeds United in July 1920 for L100. While he began the season as the starting left inside forward, he lost his position to Basil Wood. He left the team in 1921 and spent several years playing non-league football before moving to the United States in 1924 to sign with the Providence F.C. of the American Soccer League. In his first season in the league, he scored twenty-goals in twenty-nine games. In 1925, he moved to the New Bedford Whalers remaining there for the next four seasons. In 1929, Best played two games for the Fall River Marksmen. He then jumped to the Pawtucket Rangers for the remainder of the season. In the summer of 1930, Best rejoined the Whalers, leading the league in scoring with thirty-five goals in twenty-seven games in the fall 1930 season. In 1931, Best moved back to England, signing with Clapton Orient for two seasons. In 1933, he transferred to Darlington where he became one of the club's all-time leading scorers. He finished his career with Hull City in the 1936–37 season.

Honours

As a player 
Darlington
Third Division (North) Cup winner: 1933–34
Third Division (North) Cup runner-up: 1935–36

References

1901 births
English footballers
Newcastle United F.C. players
Leeds United F.C. players
American Soccer League (1921–1933) players
Providence Clamdiggers players
New Bedford Whalers players
Fall River Marksmen players
Pawtucket Rangers players
Leyton Orient F.C. players
Darlington F.C. players
Hull City A.F.C. players
1975 deaths
Association football forwards
English expatriate sportspeople in the United States
Expatriate soccer players in the United States
English expatriate footballers
People from Mickley, Northumberland
Footballers from Northumberland